This page lists the World Best Year Performance in the year 1996 in both the men's and the women's hammer throw. The main event during this season were the Olympic Games in Atlanta, United States, where the final was held on July 28, 1996.

Men

Records

1996 World Year Ranking

Women

Records

1996 World Year Ranking

References
tilastopaja
apulanta
apulanta
hammerthrow.wz

1996
Hammer Throw Year Ranking, 1996